"Save Me" is a song by the British rock band Queen from their 1980 album The Game. Written by guitarist Brian May, it was recorded in 1979, and released in the UK on 25 January 1980, nearly six months prior to the release of the album. "Save Me" spent six weeks on the UK Singles Chart, peaking at number 11. It was the band's first single release of the 1980s.

The power ballad was played live from 1979 to 1982 and was recorded for their live albums, Queen Rock Montreal at the Montreal Forum, Quebec, Canada in November 1981 and Queen on Fire – Live at the Bowl at the Milton Keynes Bowl, Buckinghamshire, England in June 1982. The song is also included on Queen's Greatest Hits and Queen Forever albums. A circulating video of the performance during the Concerts for the People of Kampuchea at the Hammersmith Odeon in 1979 also exists.

History
Brian May wrote "Save Me" about friend and bandmate Freddie Mercury. Recorded in the Summer of 1979 in Munich, the song was written when Mercury's relationship with American chef Joe Fanelli had just ended. During an interview for the radio show In the Studio with Redbeard, May stated: "I wrote ['Save Me']—to cut a long story short—I wrote it about a friend, someone who was going through a bad time, and I imagined myself in their shoes, kind of telling the story. Someone whose relationship is totally fucked up and how sad that person was."

Technical details
Musically, the song is complex, with the verses in the key of G major, and the chorus in the key of D major. An instrumental solo, in the related key of G major, serves as a verse.

Music video
The video for the song was filmed at Alexandra Palace on 22 December 1979 and directed by Keith "Keef" MacMillan and features animation of a woman and a dove. The video would be the last to feature Freddie without a moustache until 1984, as he would sport it starting with the next video for "Play the Game" until he shaved it off for the music video for "I Want to Break Free".

Personnel
Freddie Mercury – lead and backing vocals
Brian May – acoustic and electric guitars, piano, synthesizer, backing vocals
Roger Taylor – drums, backing vocals
John Deacon – bass guitar

Charts

Weekly charts

Year-end charts

References

External links
Official YouTube videos: original music video, Live at the Bowl
 Lyrics at Queen official website

Queen (band) songs
1980 singles
Songs written by Brian May
Song recordings produced by Reinhold Mack
EMI Records singles
Elektra Records singles
Hollywood Records singles
1980 songs
Rock ballads